Mohamed Ramadan (born 6 July 1931) is a Lebanese fencer. He competed in the individual and team épée events at the 1960 Summer Olympics.

References

External links
 

1931 births
Possibly living people
Lebanese male épée fencers
Olympic fencers of Lebanon
Fencers at the 1960 Summer Olympics